Itani is a surname. Notable people with the surname include:

Ahmad Itani (born 1979), Lebanese football player
Frances Itani (born 1942), Canadian fiction writer, poet and essayist
Junichiro Itani (1926–2001), anthropologist and founder of Japanese primatology
Kazuya Itani (born 1988), Japanese badminton player
Muhieddine Itani (born 1929), Lebanese football player
Munir Itani, Lebanese alpine skier and Olympian
Ted Itani, retired Canadian military officer and humanitarian

Japanese-language surnames
Arabic-language surnames